The historiography of the French Revolution stretches back over two hundred years, as commentators and historians have used a vast array of primary sources to explain the origins of the Revolution, and its meaning and its impact. By the year 2000, many historians were saying that the field of the French Revolution was in intellectual disarray. The old model or paradigm focusing on class conflict has been largely abandoned but no new explanatory model had gained widespread support. Nevertheless, there persists a very widespread agreement that the French Revolution was the watershed between the premodern and modern eras of Western history.

Contemporary and 19th-century historians
The literature in French is vast, and in English quite substantial.

Adolphe Thiers and French historians
The first major work on the Revolution by a French historian was published between 1823 and 1827 by Adolphe Thiers. His celebrated Histoire de la Révolution française, in ten volumes, founded his literary reputation and launched his political career. The complete work of ten volumes sold ten thousand sets, an enormous number for the time. It went through four more editions. Thiers' history was particularly popular in liberal circles and among younger Parisians. Written during the Restoration, when the tricolor flag and singing the Marseillaise were forbidden, the book praised the principles, leaders and accomplishments of the 1789 Revolution; the clear heroes were Mirabeau, Lafayette, and other moderate leaders. It condemned Marat, Robespierre and the other radical leaders, and also condemned the monarchy, aristocracy and clergy for their inability to change. The book played a notable role in undermining the legitimacy of the Bourbon regime of Charles X, and bringing about the July Revolution of 1830. Thiers went on to become a Deputy, twice Prime Minister, and the first president of the Third French Republic. He also headed the French government in 1871 which suppressed the Paris Commune.

Thiers' history of the Revolution was praised by the French authors Chateaubriand, Stendhal, and Sainte-Beuve, was translated into English (1838) and Spanish (1889), and won him a seat in the Académie française in 1834. It was less appreciated by British critics, in large part because of his favorable view of the French Revolution and of Napoleon Bonaparte. The British historian Thomas Carlyle, who wrote his own history of the French Revolution, complained that it "was far as possible from meriting its high reputation", though he admitted that Thiers is "a brisk man in his way, and will tell you much if you know nothing." The British historian Hugh Chisholm wrote in the 1911 edition of the Encyclopædia Britannica,  "Thiers' historical work is marked by extreme inaccuracy, by prejudice which passes the limits of accidental unfairness, and by an almost complete indifference to the merits as compared with the successes of his heroes."

Attacks from the right
The constant stream of major books began with Edmund Burke's Reflections on the Revolution in France (1790). In it he established the conservative stream of opinion, wherein even the revolution of July 1789 went "too far". His book is not so much studied today as part of Revolution studies, but rather as a classic of conservative political philosophy. In France, conspiracy theories were rife in the highly charged political atmosphere, with the Abbé Barruel, in perhaps the most influential work Memoirs Illustrating the History of Jacobinism (1797–1798), arguing that Freemasons and other dissidents had been responsible for an attempt to destroy the monarchy and the Catholic Church. Hippolyte Taine (1828–1893) was among the more conservative of the originators of social history. His most famous work is his Origines de la France Contemporaine (1875–1893).

From 1833 to 1842, the prolific British author Sir Archibald Alison wrote and published a ten-volume history of the Revolution and the Napoleonic Wars, called History of Europe from the Commencement of the French Revolution in 1789 to the Restoration of the Bourbons in 1815. His view was markedly conservative and quite akin to that which Burke held; Alison saw the practical use of theoretical Enlightenment ideas as foolhardy and dangerous. The immense work was highly popular in its time despite its author's notorious wordiness.

Many minor studies appeared, such as The French Revolution: A Study in Democracy by British writer Nesta Webster, published in 1919. It advanced the theory that the progress of the French Revolution was considerably influenced by a conspiracy conducted by "the lodges of the German Freemasons and Illuminati".

Liberal support for 1789–1791
A simplified description of the liberal approach to the Revolution was typically to support the achievements of the constitutional monarchy of the National Assembly but disown the later actions of radical violence like the invasion of the Tuileries and the Terror. French historians of the first half of the 19th century like the politician and man of letters François Guizot (1787–1874), historian François Mignet (published Histoire de la Révolution française in 1824), and famous philosopher Alexis de Tocqueville (L'Ancien Régime et la Révolution, 1856) established and wrote in this tradition.

Jules Michelet (1798–1874) – His Histoire de la Révolution française, published after the Revolution of 1848, is a major history. Historian François Furet, a leader of the Annales School, argues that his multivolume history remains "the cornerstone of all revolutionary historiography and is also a literary monument." His aphoristic style emphasized his anti-clerical republicanism.

Others in the 19th century
Other French historians in the 19th-century include:

Louis Blanc (1811–1882) – Blanc's 13-volume Histoire de la Révolution française (1847–1862) displays utopian socialist views, and sympathizes with Jacobinism.
Théodore Gosselin  (1855–1935) – Better known by the pseudonym "G. Lenotre".
Albert Sorel (1842–1906) – Diplomatic historian; L'Europe et la Révolution française (8 volumes, 1895–1904); introductory section of this work translated as Europe under the Old Regime (1947).
 Edgar Quinet (1803–1875) – Late Romantic anti-Catholic nationalist.

Thomas Carlyle
One of the most famous English works on the Revolution remains Thomas Carlyle's three-volume The French Revolution, A History (1837) . It is a romantic work, both in style and viewpoint. Passionate in his concern for the poor and in his interest in the fears and hopes of revolution, he (while reasonably historically accurate) is often more concerned with conveying his impression of the hopes and aspirations of people (and his opposition to ossified ideology"formulas" or "Isms"as he called them) than with strict adherence to fact. The undoubted passion and intensity of the text may also be due to the famous incident where he sent the completed draft of the first volume to John Stuart Mill for comment, only for Mill's maid to accidentally burn the volume to ashes, forcing Carlyle to start from scratch. He wrote to Ralph Waldo Emerson that the writing of the book was the "dreadfulest labor [he] ever undertook".

Anarchists
In 1909, Peter Kropotkin, a Russian anarchist, published The Great French Revolution, which attempts to round out the political approach with the perspective and contribution to the Revolution of the common man.

Alphonse Aulard and academic studies
Alphonse Aulard (1849–1928) was the first professional historian of the Revolution; he promoted graduate studies, scholarly editions, and learned journals. His appointment to the Sorbonne was promoted and funded by Republicans in the national and Paris governments, but he was not himself involved in party politics. He promoted a republican, bourgeois, and anticlerical view of the revolution.  From 1886 he taught at the Sorbonne, trained advanced students, founded the Société de l'Histoire de la Révolution, and edited the scholarly journal La Révolution française. He assembled and published many key primary sources. He professionalized scholarship in the field, moving away from the literary multi-volume studies aimed at an upscale general public, promoting special political ideals, that had characterized writing on the Revolution before the 1880s. Instead his work was aimed at fellow scholars and researchers. His broad interpretation argued:
From the social point of view, the Revolution consisted in the suppression of what was called the feudal system, in the emancipation of the individual, in greater division of landed property, the abolition of the privileges of noble birth, the establishment of equality, the simplification of life.... The French Revolution differed from other revolutions in being not merely national, for it aimed at benefiting all humanity."

Aulard's historiography was based on positivism. The assumption was that methodology was all-important and the historian's duty was to present in chronological order the duly verified facts, to analyze relations between facts, and provide the most likely interpretation. Full documentation based on research in the primary sources was essential.  He took the lead in training advanced students in the proper use and analysis of primary sources. Aulard's famous four volume history of the Revolution focused on technical issues.

Aulard's books favored the study of parliamentary debates, not action in the street; institutions, not insurrections. He emphasized public opinion, elections, parties, parliamentary majorities, and legislation. He recognized the complications that prevented the Revolution from fulfilling all its ideal promises – as when the legislators of 1793 made suffrage universal for all French men, but also established the dictatorship of the Terror.

Marxist/Classic interpretation
The dominating approach to the French Revolution in historical scholarship in the first half of the 20th century was the Marxist, or Classic, approach. This view sees the French Revolution as an essentially bourgeois revolution, marked by class struggle and resulting in a victory of the bourgeoisie. Influenced by socialist politician Jean Jaurès and historian Albert Mathiez (who broke with his teacher Aulard regarding class conflict), historians on the left led by Georges Lefebvre and Albert Soboul developed this view.

Lefebvre was inspired by Jaurès and came to the field from a mildly socialist viewpoint. His massive and reputation-making thesis, Les paysans du Nord (1924), was an account of the Revolution among provincial peasants. He continued to research along these lines, publishing The Great Fear of 1789 (1932, first English translation 1973), about the panic and violence which spread throughout rural France in the summer of 1789. His work largely approaches the Revolution "from below", favouring explanations in terms of classes. His most famous work was Quatre-Vingt-Neuf (literally Eighty-Nine, published in 1939 and translated into English as The Coming of the French Revolution, 1947). This skilfully and persuasively argued work interprets the Revolution through a Marxist lens: first there is the "aristocratic revolution" of the Assembly of Notables and the Paris Parlement in 1788; then the "bourgeois revolution" of the Third Estate; the "popular revolution", symbolised by the fall of the Bastille; and the "peasant revolution", represented by the "Great Fear" in the provinces and the burning of châteaux. (Alternately, one can view 1788 as the aristocratic revolution, 1789 the bourgeois revolution, and 1792/3 the popular revolution). This interpretation sees a rising capitalist middle-class overthrow a dying-out feudal aristocratic ruling caste, and held the field for almost twenty years. His major publication was La Révolution française (1957, translated and published in English in two volumes, 1962–1967). This, and particularly his later work on Napoleon and the Directory, remains highly regarded.

Some other influential French historians of this period:

 Ernest Labrousse (1895–1988) – Performed extensive economic research on 18th-century France.
 Albert Soboul (1914–1982) – Performed exhaustive research on the lower classes of the Revolution; his most famous work is The Sans-Culottes (1968).
 George Rudé (1910–1993) – Another of Lefebvre's protégés, did further work on the popular side of the Revolution: The Crowd in the French Revolution (1959) is one of his most famous works.
 Daniel Guérin (1904–1988) – An anarchist, he is highly critical of the Jacobins.

Some of the significant conservative French historians of this period include:

Pierre Gaxotte (1895–1982) – Royalist: The French Revolution (1928).
Augustin Cochin (1876–1916) – Attributed the origins of the Revolution to activities of the intelligentsia.
Albert Sorel (1842–1906) – Diplomatic historian: Europe et la Révolution française (eight volumes, 1895–1904); introductory section of this work translated as Europe under the Old Regime (1947).

The following five scholars have served as Chairs in the History of the French Revolution at the Sorbonne:

 Hippolyte Taine
 F.A. Aulard – 1891 (for more than thirty years)
 Georges Lefebvre – 1937–1959
 Albert Soboul – 1967–1982
 Michel Vovelle – 1982

Revisionism and modern work
"Revisionism" in this context means the rejection of the Orthodox/Marxist model of a revolution carried out by the bourgeoisie against the aristocracy on the right, with intervention from the proletariat pushing it to the left.  J. B. Shank finds that 21st century trends include a broader range of topics regarding the effects of the Revolution, and a more global perspective. He cites heavy use of the Internet, resources such as the H-France daily discussion email list, and use of digital sources to scan through massive amounts of text.

Alfred Cobban
In 1954, Alfred Cobban used his inaugural lecture as Professor of French History at the University of London to attack what he called the "social interpretation" of the French Revolution. The lecture was later published as "The Myth of the French Revolution", but his seminal work arguing this point was The Social Interpretation of the French Revolution (1963). It was published in French translation only in 1984. His main point was that feudalism had long since disappeared in France; that the Revolution did not transform French society, and that it was principally a political revolution, not a social one as Lefebvre and others insisted.

Although dismissed and attacked by the mainstream journals at first, Cobban was persistent and determined, and his approach was soon supported and modified by a flood of new research both inside and outside France. American historian George V. Taylor's research established that the bourgeoisie of the Third Estate were not quite the budding capitalists they were made out to be; indeed Taylor showed the aristocrats were just as entrepreneurial if not more so. John McManners, Jean Egret, Franklin Ford and others wrote on the divided and complex situation of the nobility in pre-revolutionary France. The most significant opposition to arise in France was that of Annales historians François Furet, Denis Richet, and Mona Ozouf. Furet in the 1960s worked in terms of the Annales School, which locates the 1789 revolution in a "long" history of 19th century revolutionary France.

Richard Cobb
Another seminal figure in the revisionism debate is the Francophile Englishman Richard Cobb, who has produced a number of immensely detailed studies of both provincial and city life, avoiding the revisionism debate by "keeping his nose very close to the ground". Les armées révolutionnaires (1968, translated as The People's Armies in 1987) is his most famous work.

William Doyle
William Doyle, professor at Bristol University, has published The Origins of the French Revolution (1988) and a revisionist history, The Oxford History of the French Revolution (2nd edition 2002). Another historian working in this tradition is Keith Michael Baker. A collection of his essays (Inventing the French Revolution, 1990) examines the ideological origins of the Revolution.

Timothy Tackett
Timothy Tackett in particular has changed approach, preferring archival research to historiographical dialectics. He challenges the ideas about nobility and bourgeoise in Becoming a Revolutionary (2006), a "collective biography" via letters and diaries of the third estate deputies of 1789. His other major work is When the King Took Flight (2004), a study of the rise of republicanism and radicalism in the Legislative Assembly in 1791-2. Tackett also has several works focusing on Reign of Terror, The Coming of the Terror in the French Revolution (2015), and the psychology behind the paranoia affecting the Committee of Public Safety during the Terror. These insights provide a deeper look into how and why this event happened.

Simon Schama
Simon Schama's Citizens: A Chronicle of the French Revolution (1989) is a popular, generally moderate/conservative history of the period. It is ostensibly a narrative of "Persons" and "Events", and more in the tradition of Carlyle than Tocqueville and Lefebvre. Its narrative- while massive- focuses on the most visible leaders of the Revolution, even through its more "popular" phases.  The book's allegiance is to historical literary styles rather than schools.  Thus Schama is simultaneously able to deny the existence of a so-called "bourgeois" revolution, reserve apotheoses for Robespierre, Louis XVI, and the sans-culottes alike, and utilize historical nuance to a degree usually associated with more liberal historians.  Borrowing from the Romantics for imagery (the introduction closely follows that of Michelet's "History..."), Citizens also argues against the Romantics' belief in the necessity of the Revolution. Schama concentrates on the early years of the Revolution, the Republic only taking up about a fifth of the book. He also places increased emphasis on insurrectionary violence in Paris and violence in general, claiming that it was "not the unfortunate by-product of revolution, [but] the source of its energy."

Lynn Hunt and feminism
Lynn Hunt, though often characterized as a feminist interpreter of the Revolution, is a historian working in the wake of the revisionists. Her major works include Politics, Culture, and Class in the French Revolution (1984), and The Family Romance of the French Revolution (1992), both interpretative works. The former focuses on the creation of a new democratic political culture from scratch, assigning the Revolution's greatest meaning here, in a political culture. In the latter study she works with a somewhat Freudian interpretation, the political Revolution as a whole being seen as an enormous dysfunctional family haunted by patricide: Louis as father, Marie-Antoinette as mother, and the revolutionaries as an unruly mob of brothers.

François Furet
François Furet (1927–1997) was the leading figure in the rejection of the "classic" or "Marxist" interpretation. Desan (2000) stated he "seemed to emerge the victor from the bicentennial, both in the media and in historiographic debates." A disillusioned ex-Communist, he published his La Révolution Française in 1965–66. It marked his transition from revolutionary leftist politics to liberal center-left position, and reflected his ties to the social-science-oriented Annales School. He then moved to the right, re-examining the Revolution from the perspective of 20th century totalitarianism (as exemplified by Hitler and Stalin). His  Penser la Révolution Française (1978; translated as Interpreting the French Revolution 1981) was an influential book that led many intellectuals to reevaluate Communism and the Revolution as inherently totalitarian and anti-democratic. Looking at modern French Communism he stressed the close resemblance between the 1960s and 1790s, with both favoring the inflexible and rote ideological discourse in party cells where decisions were made unanimously in a manipulated direct democracy. Furet further suggested that popularity of the Far Left to many French intellectuals was itself a result of their commitment to the ideals of the French Revolution. Working much of the year at the University of Chicago after 1979, Furet also rejected the Annales School, with its emphasis on very long-term structural factors, and emphasized intellectual history.  Influenced by Alexis de Tocqueville and Augustin Cochin, Furet argues that Frenchmen must stop seeing the revolution as the key to all aspects of modern French history.  His works include Interpreting the French Revolution (1981), a historiographical overview of what has preceded him and A Critical Dictionary of the French Revolution (1989).

Others
Some other modern historians include:

 Marcel Gauchet (b. 1946) – Author of La Révolution des droits de l'homme (1989) and La Révolution des pouvoirs (1995).
 Patrice Higonnet – Author of Goodness Beyond Virtue: Jacobins in the French Revolution (1998).
 Owen Connelly (1924–2011) – The French Revolution and Napoleonic Era (1993).
 Henry Heller – Author of "The Bourgeois Revolution in France: 1789–1815"; his work maintains a defence of the Classic (Marxist) Interpretation of the Revolution.
 Alan Forrest (historian) (b. 1945) - Author of The French Revolution (1995) and numerous works on the social and military history.
 Olwen Hufton (b. 1938) – Writes on women in history; her principal work on the Revolution is Women and the Limits of Citizenship in the French Revolution (1999).
 Dale K. Van Kley (b. 1941) – Historian of religion, particularly in 18th century France.
 Jeremy D. Popkin (b. 1948) – A New World Begins: The History of the French Revolution (2019)
 Mark Steel (b. 1960) – Columnist and comedian; authored the humorous and accessible Vive La Revolution (2003).
 Jon Elster (b. 1940) – France before 1789: The Unraveling of an Absolutist Regime (2020).
 Colin Jones – The Fall of Robespierre: 24 Hours in Revolutionary Paris (2021).

Bibliography
Works mentioned, by date of first publication:
 
 
 
 
 
 
 
  Usually translated as The Old Regime and the French Revolution.
 
 
  Introductory part translated as Europe under the Old Regime (1947).
 Aulard, François-Alphonse. The French Revolution, a Political History, 1789–1804 (4 vol. 3rd ed. 1901; English translation 1910); volume 1 1789–1792 online;  Volume 2 1792–95 online
 
 
 
 
 
  Translated as The Great Fear of 1789 (1973).
  Translated as The Coming of the French Revolution (1947).
 
  Translated in two volumes: The French Revolution from its origins to 1793 (1962), and The French Revolution from 1793 to 1799 (1967).
 
 
  Translated as The People's Armies (1987).
  Translated as The Sans-Culottes (1972).
  Translated as Interpreting the French Revolution (1981).
 
 
 
  Translated as A Critical Dictionary of the French Revolution (1989).

References

Further reading
 
 
 Bell, David A., and Yair Mintzker, eds. Rethinking the age of revolutions: France and the birth of the modern world (Oxford UP, 2018.

 
 
 
 
 
 
 
  
  
 
  rejects Marxist models
  covers the older studies.
 
 
 
 D'Antuono, Giuseppina. "Historiographical heritages: Denis Diderot and the men of the French Revolution." Diciottesimo Secolo 6 (2021): 161-168. online

 . Basic survey of the historiography
 
 
 Desan, Suzanne. "Recent Historiography on the French Revolution and Gender." Journal of Social History 52.3 (2019): 566-574. online

 Disch, Lisa. "How could Hannah Arendt glorify the American Revolution and revile the French? Placing On Revolution in the historiography of the French and American Revolutions." European Journal of Political Theory 10.3 (2011): 350–71.
 Douthwaite, Julia V. “On Seeing the Forest through the Trees: Finding Our Way through Revolutionary Politics, History, and Art.” Eighteenth-Century Studies 43#2 2010, pp. 259–63. online
 Doyle, William. The Oxford history of the French revolution (Oxford UP, 2018).

 
 Dunne, John. "Fifty Years of Rewriting the French Revolution: Signposts Main Landmarks and Current Directions in the Historiographical Debate," History Review. (1998) pp. 8ff. 
 Edelstein, Melvin. The French Revolution and the Birth of Electoral Democracy (Routledge, 2016).
 
 Farmer, Paul. France Reviews its Revolutionary Origins (1944) 
 Friguglietti, James, and Barry Rothaus, "Interpreting vs. Understanding the Revolution: François Furet and Albert Soboul," Consortium on Revolutionary Europe 1750–1850: Proceedings, 1987 (1987) Vol. 17, pp. 23–36
 Furet, François and Mona Ozouf, eds. A Critical Dictionary of the French Revolution (1989), 1120pp; long essays by scholars; strong on history of ideas and historiography (esp pp. 881–1034)  excerpt and text search; 17 essays on leading historians, pp. 881–1032
 Furet, François. Interpreting the French revolution (1981). 
 Germani, Ian, and Robin Swayles. Symbols, myths and images of the French Revolution. University of Regina Publications. 1998. 
 Gershoy, Leo. The French Revolution and Napoleon (2nd ed. 1964), scholarly survey 
 Geyl, Pieter. Napoleon for and Against (1949), 477 pp; reviews the positions of major historians regarding Napoleon 
 Guillaume, Lancereau. "Unruly Memory and Historical Order: The Historiography of the French Revolution between Historicism and Presentism (1881-1914)." História da Historiografia: International Journal of Theory and History of Historiography 14.36 (2021): 225-256 online.

 
 Hanson, Paul R.  Contesting the French Revolution (1999), excerpt and text search, combines analytic history and historiography
 
 Heller, Henry. The Bourgeois Revolution in France (1789–1815) (Berghahn Books, 2006)  defends Marxist model 
 
 Hobsbawm, Eric J. Echoes of the Marseillaise: two centuries look back on the French Revolution (Rutgers University Press, 1990) by an English Marxist }
 Hutton, Patrick H. "The role of memory in the historiography of the french revolution." History and Theory 30.1 (1991): 56–69.
 Israel, Jonathan. Revolutionary Ideas: An Intellectual History of the French Revolution from The Rights of Man to Robespierre (2014) 
 Jones, Rhys. "Time Warps During the French Revolution." Past & Present 254.1 (2022): 87-125.

Kafker, Frank A. and James M. Laux, eds. The French Revolution: Conflicting Interpretations (5th ed. 2002) 
 Kaplan, Steven Laurence. Farewell, Revolution: The Historians' Feud, France, 1789/1989 (1996), focus on historians excerpt and text search
 Kaplan, Steven Laurence. Farewell, Revolution: Disputed Legacies, France, 1789/1989 (1995); focus on bitter debates re 200th anniversary  excerpt and text search
 Kates, Gary, ed. The French Revolution: Recent Debates and New Controversies (2nd ed. 2005)  excerpt and text search
 Kim, Minchul. "Volney and the French Revolution." Journal of the History of Ideas 79.2 (2018): 221–42.
 
 Lewis, Gwynne. The French Revolution: Rethinking the Debate (1993)  142 pp
 Lyons, Martyn. Napoleon Bonaparte and the legacy of the French Revolution (Macmillan, 1994) 
 McManners, J. "The Historiography of the French Revolution," in A.  Goodwin, editor, The New Cambridge Modern History: volume VIII: The American and French Revolutions, 1763–93 (1965) 618–52 online

 
 Minchul, Kim. “Volney and the French Revolution.” Journal of the History of Ideas 79#2 (April 2018): 221–42.
 Parker, Noel. Portrayals of Revolution: Images, Debates and Patterns of thought on the French Revolution (1990) 
 
 Rigney, Ann. The Rhetoric of Historical Representation: Three Narrative Histories of the French Revolution (Cambridge UP, 2002) covers  Alphonse de Lamartine, Jules Michelet and Louis Blanc. 
 
 Scott, Samuel F. and Barry Rothaus, eds. Historical Dictionary of the French Revolution, 1789–1799 (2 vol 1984), short essays by scholars
 
  sociological approach
 Sole,  Jacques. "Historiography of the French Revolution," in  Michael Bentley, ed. Companion to Historiography (1997) ch 19 pp. 509–25
 
 
 Tarrow, Sidney. “‘Red of Tooth and Claw’: The French Revolution and the Political ProcessThen and Now.” French Politics, Culture & Society 29#1 2011, pp. 93–110. online
 Walton, Charles. "Why the neglect? Social rights and French Revolutionary historiography." French History 33.4 (2019): 503–19.
 Williamson, George S. "Retracing the Sattelzeit: thoughts on the historiography of the French Revolutionary and Napoleonic eras." Central European History 51.1 (2018): 66-74 online.

External links
 French Revolution History in Hindi
 H-France daily discussion email list

 
French Revolution
French Revolution